The Palestinian Return Centre (PRC) is a UK-based advocacy group established in 1996 in London. It is an “independent consultancy focusing on the historical, political and legal aspects of the Palestinian Refugees”. In July 2015, PRC was given special consultative status at the United Nations as Non-governmental organisation (NGO), in a controversial vote.

The centre specialises in research and analysis of issues concerning the Palestinians who were displaced, and subsequently prevented from returning, during the 1948 Arab–Israeli War. It advocates “their internationally recognised legal right to return.”

Aims

The Palestinian Return Centre frames the problematic situation of the Palestinian Refugees in relation to the “Nakba” or “catastrophe”, as it describes the establishment of the State of Israel in 1948 and the resulting displacement of Palestinians. The issue of the Palestinian refugees’ return to Palestine is at the center of the PRC’s activities “both as a humanitarian and political concern.”

According to its website, the PRC aims to preserve the Palestinian identity and to resist attempts to resettle the dispersed Palestinians in their places of refuge. The PRC coordinates with any individual or group that shares its cause.

The organisation intends to “increase and widen awareness of the suffering of the Palestinians in the Diaspora” and to inform the general public in Europe and Britain in particular about the “truth on the many different dimensions of the Palestinian issue.”

Moreover, the organisation endeavours to “establish the status of Palestinian refugees under international law without any equivocation, and campaign for their basic human and legal rights.”

Activities

The PRC organises a wide range of events to promote the Palestinian cause both in the United Kingdom and in Europe.

Among the most recent initiatives sponsored by the Palestinian Return Centre are a public seminar in the House of Lords held in June 2015, a public briefing in the House of Parliament in June 2015, and a workshop to support Palestinian refugees in Syria.

In September 2015, the PRC organised an event to encourage public debate on the challenges facing the UN Relief and Works Agency for Palestine Refugees in the Near East (UNRWA), an organisation overtly supported by the Centre.

The PRC also produces videos and disseminates articles, books, reports and studies in support of its mission.

Publications 
Reports & Studies:

2015 Semiannual Documentary Report on Palestinian refugees in Syria. The report uses anecdotal evidence from Palestinian refugee camps and compounds inside of Syria that provides information of the daily life, health and humanitarian conditions of Palestinian refugees in Syria. It also documents the daily abuses and events that arise out of the conflict that is ongoing in Syria and that has affected the Palestinian refugees in particular. Finally, it details the situation of displaced PRS, that are displaced for the second time outside of Syria. Having fled/migrated to neighbouring countries as either a destination or transit point until they reach Europe.

Quarterly Update on Palestinian Prisoners (15 January 2012 – 30 August 2012) This Quarterly Update covers the period from 15 January 2012 to 30 August 2012. A quarterly newsletter covering the first quarter of 2012 was not issued. Therefore, this newsletter will cover the past two quarters and information to date. It provides the most up-to-date statistics on prisoners and arrests and an overview of the important trends in these quarters. In addition, it gives background on individual prisoner cases and summarises the most relevant legal, UN and EU news, as well as Addameer's activities over the reporting period.

First Bi-Annual Report of 2014 on Palestinian refugees in Syria The Action Group for Palestinians in Syria and the Palestinian Return Centre issue the First Bi-Annual Report of 2014 on the conditions of Palestinian refugees in Syria. The report highlighted on the ongoing Syrian conflict for more than three years which has led to the deterioration of the general situation of the Palestinian refugees in Syria.

Books 
PRC senior researcher Nasim Ahmed recently published the book, Understanding the Nakba, an insight into the plight of Palestinians, provides an analysis of the ongoing dispossession and exile of Palestinians. The book combines major aspects of the conflict for a better understanding of the plight of Palestinians. It pieces together fragments of the Nakba in order to comprehend the historical, political, religious and philosophical currents that have kept Palestinians in their perpetual exile.

The Palestinian Return Centre and the Al Jazeera Centre for Studies joined to produce a new book Palestinian Refugees in the Arab World: Realities & Prospects This book, Palestinian Refugees in the Arab World: Realities and Prospects looks at the most significant aspects of the Palestinian refugee and explores the future possibilities of their plight through studies and papers presented by a group of experts and researchers.

The Register of Depopulated Localities in Palestine The Palestinian Nakba is unsurpassed in history.For a country to be occupied by a foreign minority, emptied almost entirely of its people, its physical and cultural landmarks obliterated, its destruction hailed as a miraculous act of God and a victory for freedom and civilised values, all done according to a premeditated plan, meticulously executed, financially and politically supported from abroad, and still maintained today, is no doubt unique.

The Future of the Exiled Palestinians in the Settlement Agreements  The subject of the Oslo accords and the future of the exiled Palestinians is discussed today with a deep sense of urgency among themselves as well as their kinfolk in Palestine. These discussions are, more often than not, accompanied by intense feelings of anxiety expressed in the recurrent terms of; bewilderment, loss, and misery.

In its series of non-periodical publications, the Palestinian Return Centre/London has published a book titled “The Displaced Palestinians in Lebanon - the bitterness of refuge and tragedies of migration ” by the representative of the centre in Lebanon, Mr Ali Huwaidi. The book consists of 146 pages, and covers the political and humanitarian situation of the displaced Palestinians in Lebanon. The book sheds light on the category of displaced Palestinians, a marginalised and absent group on local, regional and international levels. In spite of efforts by research and study centres, activists, and those concerned with the issue of Palestinian refugees, in publishing studies, articles and reports, it was noted that this category of the Palestinian people—who sought refuge in the camps of Lebanon after the Nakba of 1948, and especially in the two camps of al Nabatiyah in South Lebanon, and Tel al Zater in East Beirut—have not been covered.

In 2006 Dr. Tariq M. Suwaidan was the author of Palestine Yesterday, Today and Tomorrow . This book is a brief overview of the long and turbulent history of Palestine, from its dawn to the present day. It is chronological sequence of events to demonstrate the significance of the ‘Holy Land‘ one of the territories over which much blood has been split throughout history.

The Palestinian Return Centre (PRC) has published the 2010 Edition of The Atlas of Palestine 1917-1966 prepared by the Palestinian writer and historian, Dr. Salman Abu Sitta. The Atlas is an outcome of more than 20 years of extensive research and academic work. It is an extended and edited edition of the "Atlas of Palestine 1948", published in 2004.

M. Siraj Sait (2003) Reappraisal of the Rights of Palestinian Refugee Children in the Occupied Territories.  "War on children" is undoubtedly one of the most inhuman legacies of the 20th century. More than 1.5 million children were killed in wars worldwide during the 1990s. Palestinian children were not exempted from this scourge. To mark the third anniversary of the Aqsa Intifada the PRC decided to organise a special week of activities in honour of the sacrifices of Palestinian children. The publication of this thought-provoking study falls within the scope of these activities.

Dr. Daud Abdullah edited in 2002 the book titled Israeli Law of Return and its Impact on the Conflict in Palestine. This book is the product of a conference organised by the Palestinian Return Centre, in London, in April 2002 under the same title. It reviews the origins of the Israeli Law of Return, its objectives, development and impact on the conflict in Palestine. The 16 essays presented here are arranged under four broad headings: from the past, ingathering the exiles, building the ethnic state, and legal issues and the future.

Dr. Salman Abu Sitta wrote in 1999 Palestinian Right to Return Sacred, Legal and Possible. Together with al Nakba Register and the map of Palestine 1948, also distributed by the PRC, this booklet should provide a concise description of the refugees issue. It should be clear by now to all concerned that there can be no peace in the Middle East without the return of the refugees to their homes.

Conferences 
Vienna, 7 May 2005 (PRC) - The Palestinian Return Centre, London, the Palestinian Association in Austria and the Expatriate Society in Austria organised a well-attended conference of Palestinian communities in Europe under the title ‘‘Palestine: Land and People - an integral and indivisible unit. No to the racist wall in Palestine'. Representatives and delegations of Palestinian communities from 21 European countries participated in the conference. Several members of the Arab diplomatic corps in Austria, officials from the Austrian government, as well as prominent members of Arab and Muslim communities participated.

In March 2006, PRC held a seminar in the Brunei lecture theatre at the University of London, with the broad participation of Palestinian organisations and figures, both official and non-governmental. The seminar titled "Towards an effective role for the Palestinians abroad in supporting the independence of the economy at home" was opened by the director of the Palestinian Return Centre, Majed Al-Zeer, who pointed to the importance of this seminar at these most difficult of times for the Palestinian people.

Sweden, 6 May 2006 (PRC) - The Fourth Palestinians in Europe Conference was successfully convened in the Swedish city of Malmo. It was held under the title ‘Deep rooted Identity and Firm Adherence to their Rights.' The conference was organised by the Palestinian Return Centre, London, and hosted by the Adalah Centre in Sweden. About 5,000 guests attended the event. They included delegations from all over the European continent, representatives of Palestinian associations, institutions and organisations both from within Europe and beyond.

The Seventh Palestinians in Europe conference concluded with distinct success under the theme “Return is a right, no Consent and no Concession” on 2 May 2009 in Milan, Italy. Thousands of Palestinians from all over the continent participated in the work of the conference attended by prominent Palestinian leaders from the Occupied homeland and abroad, in addition to a large number of public figures and representatives of Arab, Islamic and European institutions and solidarity forces.

In 2011, PRC hosted a diverse range of distinguished speakers at their annual conference in London. The conference marked the launch of the second annual Palestine Memorial Week. Dr Ghada Karmi, herself a victim of the original expulsion stated: “The Nakba is not an historic event; it goes on every day and should not be viewed as a part of a painful past that we need to overcome.” Dr Salman Abu Sitta gave a ground-breaking presentation exposing the systematic expulsion of Palestinians in 1948 and revealing the ample space in what is now Israel that can incorporate all the Palestinian refugees and the rebuilding of their destroyed villages. He urged young British people to follow in the footsteps of their parents and grandparents who opposed the Nazis and Fascists in Europe in the 1930s and 40s and oppose the Nakba.

The third Palestine Memorial Week organised by the Palestinian Return Centre (PRC) concluded after a comprehensive week of events across the UK. The week of activities, took place from 16 to 23 January 2012, aimed at commemorating the memory of Palestinian victims over the past Six decades especially the last war in Gaza. Various events took place across British universities and also at the Houses of Parliament. A tour was carried out to familiarise British audience with the latest developments in occupied Palestine.

International recognition 
On 1 June 2015 the Palestinian Return Centre was among the 10 groups recommended by the UN Committee on Non-Governmental Organizations for special consultative status with the Economic and Social Council. The PRC obtained special consultative status with 12 votes in favour, 3 against (Israel, United States and Uruguay) and 3 abstentions (Greece, India, Russian Federation) and one absent member (Burundi).

In July 2015, and despite Israel’s objection, the UN Economic and Social Council (ECOSOC) approved the recommendation.

References

External links
How Israel's media turned a British NGO into terrorists. Yoni Mendel, 4 June 2015
Palestinian Return Centre sues Israel for defamation. EI, 20 July 2015

Political advocacy groups in the United Kingdom
Palestinian diaspora
History of the Palestinian refugees